

Decoupling usually refers to the ending, removal or reverse of coupling.

Decoupling may also refer to:

Economics

 Decoupling (advertising), the purchase of services directly from suppliers rather than via an advertising agency
 Decoupling (utility regulation), the disassociation of a utility's profits from its sales
 Decoupling and re-coupling in economics and organizational studies
 Decoupling (organizational studies), creating and maintaining separation between policy, implementation and/or practice
 Decoupling of wages from productivity, sometimes known as the Great Decoupling
 Eco-economic decoupling, economic growth without increase in environmental costs

Science

 Decoupling (cosmology), transition from close interactions between particles to their effective independence
 Decoupling (meteorology), change in the interaction between atmospheric layers at night
 Decoupling (neuropsychopharmacology), changes in neurochemical binding sites as a consequence of drug tolerance
 Nuclear magnetic resonance decoupling
 Decoupling (probability), reduction of a statistic to an average derived from independent random-variable sequences
Decoupling for body-focused repetitive behaviors, technique for the reduction of body-focused repetitive behaviors

Engineering

 Decoupling (electronics), prevention of undesired energy transfer between electrical media
 Decoupling capacitor, most common implementation technique
 The amelioration of coupling in computer programming

Other

 Uncoupling of railway carriages

See also 
 Uncoupling (disambiguation)
 Coupling (disambiguation)